Arcadius Benoit Fanou (born 12 January 1972) is a Beninese sprinter. He competed in the men's 4 × 100 metres relay at the 1996 Summer Olympics.

References

1972 births
Living people
Athletes (track and field) at the 1996 Summer Olympics
Beninese male sprinters
Olympic athletes of Benin
Place of birth missing (living people)